"Hugs" is a song written and recorded by American comedy hip hop group The Lonely Island with American R&B and hip hop singer Pharrell Williams for The Lonely Island's third studio album The Wack Album.

The single premiered in North America on Saturday Night Live on May 17, 2014.

Background
"Hugs" debuted in North America as a Saturday Night Live Digital Short on the May 17, 2014 episode of the sketch comedy television series Saturday Night Live, which saw Samberg as a host.

References

The Lonely Island songs
Pharrell Williams songs
2014 singles
2013 songs
Songs written by Pharrell Williams
Republic Records singles
Comedy rap songs